Double tilde (~~ or ≈) may refer to:

Approximation [≈]
Double negation [ ~(~  ]

Smart match operator in Perl, ~~
Double binary NOT operator (as used in languages like JavaScript and PHP as a quick way to cast variable as integer, where it is called 'two tildes' to indicate a form of double negation)
In PostgreSQL the operator ~~ is equivalent to LIKE